Bombus chinensis is a species of cuckoo bumblebee. It is one the endemic pollinators of China, where its populations have been decreasing.

References

Bumblebees
Insects described in 1890